Apasionado may refer to:

Apasionados (English: Passionate People) 2002 Argentine romantic comedy film
Apasionado, album by Oscar Lopez
Apasionado, an album by Stan Getz that was released in 1990 by A&M Records, consisting of an orchestrated latin jazz suite composed by Eddie Del Barrio, Stan Getz, and Herb Alpert.

See also
Apasionada disambiguation